KSIG (1450 AM) is a radio station broadcasting a soft adult contemporary format.  Licensed to Crowley, Louisiana, United States, the station serves the Crowley and Lafayette areas.  The station is currently owned by Acadia Broadcast Partners, Inc.  Both the studios and transmitter for the station are located separately in Crowley.

History
KSIG has used the same call letters since 1947.
On October 4, 2018, Acadia Broadcast Partners, Inc. flipped KSIG (AM) from Oldies as "Kool 1450" to Soft Adult Contemporary as Sunny 95-1 with the sign-on of their new simulcast translator, K236CW, on 95.1 in Crowley, Louisiana which also covers the Lafayette, Louisiana Metro area as well.

Translators

References

External links

FCC History Cards for KSIG

Radio stations in Louisiana
Soft adult contemporary radio stations in the United States
Radio stations established in 1947
1947 establishments in Louisiana